Nikephoros Bryennios (or Nicephorus Bryennius; Greek: Νικηφόρος Βρυέννιος, Nikēphoros Bryennios; 1062–1137) was a Byzantine general, statesman and historian. He was born at Orestias (Adrianople) in the theme of Macedonia.

Life
His father (or possibly grandfather), of the same name, the governor of the theme of Dyrrhachium, had revolted against the feeble Michael VII, but had been defeated by the future Emperor Alexios I Komnenos and was blinded. The son, who was distinguished for his learning, personal beauty, and engaging qualities, gained the favour of Alexios I and the hand of his daughter Anna Komnene, receiving the titles of Caesar and panhypersebastos (one of the new dignities introduced by Alexios).

Bryennios successfully defended the walls of Constantinople against the attacks of Godfrey of Bouillon during the First Crusade (1097); conducted the peace negotiations between Alexios and Prince Bohemond I of Antioch (the Treaty of Devol, 1108); and played an important part in the defeat of Melikshah, the Seljuq sultan of Rûm, at the Battle of Philomelion (1117).

After the death of Alexios, he refused to enter into the conspiracy set afoot by his mother-in-law Irene Doukaina and his wife Anna to depose John II Komnenos, the son of Alexios, and raise him to the throne. His wife attributed his refusal to cowardice, but it seems from certain passages in his own work that he really regarded it as a crime to revolt against the rightful heir; the only reproach that can be brought against him is that he did not nip the conspiracy in the bud. He was on very friendly terms with the new emperor, John II, whom he accompanied on his Syrian campaign (1137), but was forced by illness to return to Constantinople, where he died in the same year.

Family
By his wife Anna Komnene, the kaisar Nikephoros Bryennios had several children, including:
 Alexios Bryennios Komnenos, megas doux, –c. 1161/1167
 John Doukas, c. 1103–after 1173
 Eirene Doukaina, c. 1105–?
 Maria Bryennaina Komnene, c. 1107–?

Writings
At the suggestion of his mother-in-law, he wrote a history ("Material for a History") of the period from 1057 to 1081, from the victory of Isaac I Komnenos over Michael VI to the dethronement of Nikephoros III Botaneiates by Alexios I. The work has been described as a family chronicle rather than a history, the object of which was the glorification of the house of Komnenos. Part of the introduction is probably a later addition.

In addition to information derived from older contemporaries (such as his father and father-in-law), Bryennios made use of the works of Michael Psellos, John Skylitzes and Michael Attaleiates. As might be expected, his views are biased by personal considerations and his intimacy with the royal family, which at the same time, however, afforded him unusual facilities for obtaining material. His model was Xenophon, whom he has imitated with a tolerable measure of success; he abstained from an excessive use of simile and metaphor, and his style is concise and simple. He died in 1137 before finishing the work.

Editions
Editio princeps published by Petrus Possinus in 1661.
Migne, Patrologia Graeca, cxxvii.
A. Meineke (with du Cange's commentary), Corpus Scriptorum Historiae Byzantinae, Bonn, 1836. (available online)
P. Gautier (with French translation), Corpus Fontium Historiae Byzantinae 9, Brussels, 1975.

Notes

References
The Oxford Dictionary of Byzantium, Oxford University Press, 1991.

Attribution

1062 births
1137 deaths
People from Orestiada
Nikephoros
Komnenos dynasty
11th-century Byzantine historians
Byzantine generals
12th-century Byzantine historians
Caesars (Byzantine nobles)
Generals of Alexios I Komnenos
Byzantine people of the Byzantine–Seljuk wars
Panhypersebastoi
Family of Alexios I Komnenos